In the Year of the Boar and Jackie Robinson is a children's novel by Bette Bao Lord and illustrator Marc Simont about a young girl named Shirley Temple Wong who leaves a secure life within her clan in China following World War II. 

In 1947, the Year of the Boar, Sixth Cousin, also known as Bandit, leaves China with her parents for a new beginning in America. Proud of the American name that she chose herself, Shirley Temple Wong is optimistic that her new home will be the land of many opportunities. But it's harder than she expected. Though her classmates in Brooklyn come from a variety of backgrounds, Shirley is the only one who doesn't speak English, and she worries that she will never have a friend. Then she gets in a fight with Mabel, the tallest, scariest girl in the fifth grade. Though Shirley winds up with two black eyes, she is faithful to the code of childhood and doesn't tell anyone what happened.
Her silence gains her the respect and friendship of Mabel, who gives her the gift that truly changes her life: baseball. Soon Shirley is the biggest Brooklyn Dodgers fan of all, listening to the radio to hear the triumphs and heartbreaks of the team and her hero, Jackie Robinson. Meanwhile, she takes piano lessons from her landlord, Señora Rodriguez, and saves money by baby-sitting Mrs. O'Reilly's triplets. She begins to feel at home, and yet deep within herself Shirley discovers that she wants to hold on to her memories of China, and the knowledge that she is Chinese inside, as well as American. She can be both — a "double happiness." Also, when Shirley is sad, there is always someone painting.

References

1984 American novels
1984 children's books
Literature by Chinese-American women
Books illustrated by Marc Simont
American children's novels
Children's historical novels
Novels about immigration to the United States
Novels set in New York City
Harper & Row books
Chinese-American novels